Steeles Avenue is an east–west street that forms the northern city limit of Toronto and the southern limit of York Region in Ontario, Canada.

York Region refers to Steeles Avenue as Regional Road 95 but the designation is strictly internal and there are no signs posted; as the street was always owned and maintained by the City of Toronto (succeeding Metropolitan Toronto). Through Peel and Halton Regions, the street is signed as Peel Road 15 and Halton Road 8, respectively.

The combination of Steeles and Taunton Road is the only arterial road to cross almost the entire Greater Toronto Area without breaks or turnoffs.

History

The street is named after Thomas Steele (1806-1877), the first proprietor of the Green Bush Inn on the northwest corner of the street's intersection with Yonge Street in Thornhill. Thomas Steele also previously managed an Inn in Bond Head, Ontario. The street's name originally contained an apostrophe (before the 'S'), a suggestive of Steele's possession of the inn and land around the intersection, but it was dropped by the mid-20th century.

Steeles in Scarborough was once referred to as Scarborough Town Line from 1850 to 1953. The section west of Yonge (bordering Vaughan) was called Vaughan Town Line. Prior to 1967, Steeles Avenue was named Upper Base Line (Lower Base Line being Eglinton Avenue, which is still named as such) in Halton County.

Steeles became a division boundary in 1953 when the road, which was a common township boundary across the width of the-then York County between the more urban townships surrounding the old City of Toronto and the more rural ones farther north, was chosen as the northern boundary of the new Metropolitan Toronto, which was severed from the county that year. To the west in Peel County, it was also the southern boundary of Chinguacousy Township and the Town of Brampton and the northern boundary of Toronto Township (later the Town of Mississauga between 1968 and 1974) until the municipal restructuring of 1974 brought Steeles fully within Brampton when the new city limits were set to the south at the-then future Highway 407 corridor and the Canadian National Halton Subdivision.

A  stretch of Steeles Avenue will be widened from east of Tapscott Road to just east of Ninth Line from 2020 to 2024.

Route description

Starting from the east, the road begins at Scarborough-Pickering Town Line/York-Durham Line, although east of the town line, the road continues as Taunton Road or Durham Regional Road 4. Taunton Road continues as is until reaching Highway 35, where it becomes Concession Road 6, then after a turn, will become East Town Line, then to 6th Line, before ending at County Road 65.

Steeles is a two-lane rural road until east of Markham Road. It becomes a four lane suburban road with bicycle lanes on each side between Markham and Kennedy Roads, six lanes from Kennedy to Victoria Park Avenue, and eight lanes from Victoria Park to the interchange with Highway 404. West of there, it alternates between four and six lanes the rest of way to Albion Road. Like many other east–west arterial roads within Toronto and York Region, Steeles is divided into east and west segments by Yonge Street.

Although on the boundary between the two municipalities, the Toronto-York Region portion of the road is maintained by Toronto. As a result, limited planning authority is granted to Toronto over York Region for lands that is within  of Steeles; formalized through a 1974 agreement between Metropolitan Toronto (succeeded by the amalgamated City of Toronto) and York Region. For instance, Toronto city councillor David Shiner invoked the 1974 agreement to veto a proposed condo development that would replace the Shops on Steeles mall. Due to an ongoing dispute on the widening and maintenance costs of Steeles, York Region's proposed Markham Bypass to Morningside Avenue has been stalled.

The areas around the street in Toronto and York Region consists of farmland (within the Rouge National Urban Park) in the east, a mix of commercial and residential in the middle, and industrial zones near the west.

West of Albion Road, Steeles Avenue continues into Brampton in Peel Region, where it is also designated as Peel Regional Road 15. Like the section in Toronto, Steeles Avenue has east–west segments, this time on either side of Hurontario and Main Streets. Steeles Avenue continues into Halton Region, where it is also designated as Halton Regional Road 8, through the town of Milton, crossing Highway 401 (no interchange) and ending at Appleby Line at a T intersection.

Originally, the road had a second section west of the height of the Niagara Escarpment (the location of the Crawford Lake Conservation Area), which ran from just east of Guelph Line west to the Milborough Townline on the boundary between Milton and Hamilton, but this section was renamed to Conservation Road and is thus no longer part of Steeles.

Public transit
Toronto and York Region

The road is served predominantly by the TTC, having daytime bus routes 53 Steeles East and 60 Steeles West. Both routes turn south at Yonge Street to terminate at Finch Station on the eastern portion of the Line 1 Yonge–University subway line. There are also two counterpart express bus routes during the rush hours, 953 Steeles East Express and 960 Steeles West Express, as well as one overnight Blue Night route, the 353 Steeles Blue Night. YRT routes 88 and 91 also passes a short portion of Steeles West and Steeles East, respectively.

Several TTC bus routes provide service on north-south arterial roads in York Region that continue north from Toronto on a contractual basis. Steeles forms the fare zone boundary, and extra fare is required for bus riders to continue across it.

On December 17, 2017, an extension of the western portion of the Line 1 subway up to Vaughan was opened, passing through York University, with a station at Steeles called Pioneer Village. The station was named after the nearby Black Creek Pioneer Village heritage museum (as opposed to simply having a West designation as is the practice on most of the western section of the line). Unlike TTC-contracted bus routes however, no extra fare is charged when crossing Steeles on the subway, due to the difficulty of implementing a payment-on-exit system. MoveOntario 2020 also includes plans to extend the Yonge subway line north and add a station at Steeles.

Brampton

Brampton Transit routes 11 Steeles, 51 Hereford, and 511 Züm Steeles (bus rapid transit) run along much of the street in Brampton. The 11A branch of route 11 serves the street from Brampton Gateway Terminal to Humber College, while limited trips along route 11 and all 511 Züm Steels trips run from Lisgar GO Station to Humber College. Route 51 Hereford serves the route west of Brampton Gateway Terminal to Mississauga Road. In addition, several other routes run along it for shorter stretches.

Milton

Milton Transit operates 2 routes that run along part of Steeles Avenue in Milton: 1 Industrial and 2 Main. Route 2 runs between Lawson Road and Thompson Road before going south. Route 1 is split into 3 branches, 1A, 1B and 1C. Routes 1A and 1B are separate directions in a loop, running on Steeles between Industrial Drive and Ontario Street and Thompson Road and Esquesing Line while route 1C operates on the section of Steeles between Martin Street and Ontario Street.

Canadian Automobile Association rating
Steeles Avenue was listed by the CAA as the "worst road in Ontario" for 2006, and as the fifth-worst road in October 2007. In October 2008, it was again crowned the worst road in Ontario. Reasons include potholes and general quality of surface. Soon after the results of CAA's survey were made public, some parts of the road between Dufferin Street and Bayview Avenue were resurfaced. The results of the 2009 survey listed Steeles as Ontario's worst road, for the second year in a row.

However, in 2010, Steeles Avenue was resurfaced from Yonge Street to Markham Road, with the funds coming from the federal infrastructure stimulus program, and the CAA named it the "Best Road in Ontario".

Landmarks
Landmarks and notable sites along Steeles from west to east

References

Roads in Toronto
Roads in Brampton
Roads in the Regional Municipality of Peel